The Catalan Rugby League Championship is the rugby league competition for clubs in Catalonia, promoted by the Catalan Rugby League Association (ACRL) and played since 2009.

2010 Catalan Rugby League Championship

Group 1

Group 2

3rd and 4th places

Final

2009 Catalan Rugby League Championship

Group 1

Group 2

3rd and 4th places

Final

Clubs

 Club de Rugby Tarragona
 Club de Rugby Sant Cugat
 Garrotxa Rugbi Club
 Club Natació Poble Nou - Enginyers
 CE INEF Lleida
 Club Atlètic Vic - Crancs
 Club Rugby Valls
 GEIEG
 Barcelona Universitari Club

Past winners
2009 Barcelona Universitari Club
2010 Barcelona Universitari Club

See also

List of rugby league competitions

References

External links
 Catalan Rugby League Championship 
 Group 1 
 Group 2 

European rugby league competitions
Rugby league in Catalonia